Matthew Appleyard (c. 1660 – June 1700) was an English politician.

He was the third son of Sir Matthew Appleyard (c.1607–1670) and his wife Frances, daughter of Sir William Pelham. He was educated at Beverley School and at St John's College, Cambridge.

He was a Member of Parliament (MP) for Hedon from 1689 to 1695.

References 
 

1660s births
Year of birth uncertain
1700 deaths
People educated at Beverley Grammar School
Alumni of St John's College, Cambridge
English MPs 1689–1690
English MPs 1690–1695
Members of the Parliament of England for Hedon